Jean Gabriel Silvain Olivier Ludovic Heraud (1 January 1913 – 15 December 2007) was a French sports shooter. He competed in the 25 m pistol event at the 1952 Summer Olympics.

References

1913 births
2007 deaths
French male sport shooters
Olympic shooters of France
Shooters at the 1952 Summer Olympics